Peter Schwerdtfeger (born September 1, 1955) is a German scientist. He holds a chair in theoretical chemistry at Massey University in Auckland, New Zealand, serves as Director of the Centre for Theoretical Chemistry and Physics, is the Head of the New Zealand Institute for Advanced Study, and is a former president of the Alexander von Humboldt Foundation.

Academic career 

Schwerdtfeger took his first degree in Chemical Engineering at Aalen University in 1976, after finishing a degree as chemical-technical assistant at the Institute Dr. Flad in Stuttgart in 1973. He studied chemistry, physics and mathematics at Stuttgart University where he received his PhD in theoretical chemistry in 1986. He received a Feodor-Lynen fellowship of the Alexander von Humboldt Foundation to join the chemistry department and later the School of Engineering at University of Auckland in 1987. After a two years research fellowship at the Research School of Chemistry (Australian National University), he returned to Auckland University in 1991 for a lectureship in chemistry. He received his habilitation and venia legendi (Privatdozent) in 1995 from the Philipps University of Marburg. He held a personal chair in physical chemistry for five years until moving to Massey University Albany in 2004, where he established the Centre for Theoretical Chemistry and Physics. He became a founding member of the New Zealand Institute for Advanced Study in 2007. In 2007 he received the Royal Society Australasian Chemistry Lectureship, and was the Källen Lecturer in Physics at Lund University (Sweden) in 2015. From 2017-2018 he was member of the Centre for Advanced Study at the Norwegian Academy of Science and Letters. He has published 350 papers in international journals. He was awarded eight consecutive Marsden awards by the Royal Society of New Zealand.

Fellowships and awards 
2001 James Cook Fellowship 
2011 Fukui Medal  
2012 Fellow of the International Academy of Quantum Molecular Science.
2014 Royal Society of New Zealand's Rutherford Medal.
2019 Dan Walls Medal

Selected publications

References

External links
Official web site

1955 births
Living people
20th-century German chemists
Academic staff of the Massey University
Scientists from Stuttgart
Recipients of the Rutherford Medal
21st-century New Zealand chemists
Fellows of the Australian Academy of Technological Sciences and Engineering
Theoretical chemists